Make a Million may refer to:

 Make-A-Million, a card game created by Parker Brothers and released in 1935
 Make a Million (film), a 1935 American film directed by Lewis D. Collins

See also
 Make Millions, a business simulation game released in 1984